Sanjay Kumar is an Indian wrestler. 
Date of birth:	1983-12-31
Height:	172 cm
Weight:	84 kg
Club:	Army Sportsclub Delhi
Coach:	Hargobind Singh, 1997
Profession:	he is serving in the army
At the 2010 Commonwealth Games, he won a gold in the Men's Greco-Roman 74 kg wrestling.

References 

Indian male sport wrestlers
Living people
Commonwealth Games gold medallists for India
Wrestlers at the 2010 Commonwealth Games
Wrestlers at the 2010 Asian Games
Wrestlers at the 2006 Asian Games
Commonwealth Games medallists in wrestling
Year of birth missing (living people)
Asian Games competitors for India
21st-century Indian people
Medallists at the 2010 Commonwealth Games